François Mathieu (1962 - 2007) was a French neo-impressionist painter.

François Mathieu was born in Dijon, France. After receiving his artistic education there, he followed the Old French School style, and was influenced by masters such as Georges Seurat and Paul Signac. Mathieu was a pointillist. He died in India at the age of 45.

References

External links
  Francois Mathieu biography
 Francois Mathieu and the Lost Art of Pointillism

1962 births
2007 deaths
20th-century French painters
20th-century French male artists
French male painters
21st-century French painters
21st-century French male artists
Post-impressionist painters
Pointillism